Jim Rice is an American politician serving as a member of the Idaho Senate from the 10th district. He was appointed to the seat in March 2012 by Idaho Governor Butch Otter.

Education
Rice graduated from Melba High School. He attended Brigham Young University and earned his Juris Doctor from William Howard Taft University.

Career
When Idaho Senator John McGee resigned his seat after allegations of sexual assault, the Legislative District 10 Republican Central Committee met to fill the vacancy in the Senate seat, sending three names in order of preference to Governor Butch Otter: Rice, Brandon Hixon, and Jarom Wagoner, all of whom resided in Caldwell, Idaho. Governor Otter appointed Rice to serve the remainder of McGee's term.

Committee assignments

Local Government and Taxation Committee (Chair 2019 to present)
Transportation Committee from 2012 to 2014, and 2018–present
From 2012 to 2018 he served on the Agriculture Affairs Committee. Chairman from 2014-2019

Elections

References

External links
Jim Rice at the Idaho Legislature
Campaign site
 

Place of birth missing (living people)
Year of birth missing (living people)
Living people
Brigham Young University alumni
Idaho lawyers
Republican Party Idaho state senators
People from Caldwell, Idaho
21st-century American politicians